Since the 2007 municipal reform, Venstre had always had an absolute majority of seats in Herning Municipality. On November 30, 2020, Lars Krarup, mayor at the time, announced his resignation, and cited that he did it to make room for Dorte West. 
Despite losing 2 seats, Venstre would once again win an absolute majority of seats, and it was later announced that Dorte West would continue as mayor, which she had been since Lars Krarup stepped down.

Electoral system
For elections to Danish municipalities, a number varying from 9 to 31 are chosen to be elected to the municipal council. The seats are then allocated using the D'Hondt method and a closed list proportional representation.
Herning Municipality had 31 seats in 2021

Unlike in Danish General Elections, in elections to municipal councils, electoral alliances are allowed.

Electoral alliances  

Electoral Alliance 1

Electoral Alliance 2

Electoral Alliance 3

Results

Notes

References 

Herning